Alan Silva (born Alan Lee da Silva; January 22, 1939 in Bermuda) is an American free jazz double bassist and keyboard player.

Biography
Silva was born a British subject to an Azorean/Portuguese mother, Irene da Silva, and a black Bermudian father known only as "Ruby". He emigrated to the United States at the age of five with his mother, eventually acquiring U.S. citizenship by the age of 18 or 19. He adopted the stage name of Alan Silva in his twenties.

Silva was quoted in a Bermudan newspaper in 1988 as saying that although he left the island at a young age, he always considered himself Bermudian. He was raised in the Harlem neighborhood of New York City, where he first began studying the trumpet, and moved on to study the upright bass.

Silva is known as one of the most inventive bass players in jazz and has performed with many in the world of avant-garde jazz, including Cecil Taylor, Sun Ra, Albert Ayler, Sunny Murray, and Archie Shepp.

Silva performed in 1964's October Revolution in Jazz as a pioneer in the free jazz movement, and for Ayler's Live in Greenwich Village album. He has lived mainly in Paris since the early 1970s, where he formed the Celestrial Communication Orchestra, a group dedicated to the performance of free jazz with various instrumental combinations. In the 1990s he picked up the electronic keyboard, declaring that his bass playing no longer surprised him. He has also used the electric violin and electric sarangi on his recordings.

In the 1980s, Silva opened a music school I.A.C.P. (Institute for Art, Culture and Perception) in Central Paris, introducing the concept of a Jazz Conservatory patterned after France's traditional conservatories devoted to European classical music epochs.

Since around 2000, he has performed more frequently as a bassist and bandleader, notably at New York City's annual Vision Festivals.

Discography

As leader or co-leader

As sideman 

with Albert Ayler
 Albert Ayler in Greenwich Village (Impulse!, 1967) – live recorded in 1966-67
 Love Cry (Impulse!, 1968) – recorded in 1966-67

with Abdelhai Bennani
 Enfance (Marge, 1998)
 Entrelacs (Tampon Ramier, 2003) – live recorded in 1999
 New Today, New Everyday (Improvising Beings, 2012)
 Free Form Improvisation Ensemble 2013 (Improvising Beings, 2015)[2CD]

with Dave Burrell
 Echo (BYG Actuel, 1969)
 After Love (America, 1971) – recorded in 1970

with Bill Dixon
 Bill Dixon in Italy Volume One (Soul Note, 1980)
 Bill Dixon in Italy Volume Two (Soul Note, 1981)
 Considerations 1 (Fore, 1981)
 November 1981 (Soul Note, 1982)

with Bobby Few
 More Or Less Few (Center of the World)
 Rhapsody in Few (Black Saint)
 Solos & Duets with Frank Wright (Sun Records)

with Sunny Murray
 Sunny Murray (ESP Disk, 1966)
 Big Chief (Pathé, 1969)
 Sunshine (BYG Actuel, 1969)
 Homage to Africa (BYG Actuel, 1970)
 Aigu-Grave (Marge, 1980)
 Perles Noires Volume 1 (Eremite, 2005) – live recorded in 2002-04

with Sun Ra
 Sun Ra-Featuring Pharoah Sanders and Black Harold (Saturn, 1976) – live recorded in 1964
 Nuit de la Fondation Maeght Vol. 1 (Shandar)
 Nuit de la Fondation Maeght Vol. 2 (Shandar)
 It's After the End of the World (MPS, 1970) – live
 Out In Space (MPS)

with Archie Shepp
 Poem for Malcolm (BYG Actuel, 1969)
 Live at the Pan-African Festival (BYG Actuel, 1971) – live recorded in 1969

with Cecil Taylor
 Unit Structures (Blue Note, 1966)
 Conquistador! (Blue Note, 1968) – recorded in 1966
 Les Grandes Répétitions (CBS/Sony, [not released]) – recorded in 1966
 It is in the Brewing Luminous (hat Hut, 1981) – live recorded in 1980

with Frank Wright
 Center of the World (Center of the World, 1972) – live
 Last Polka in Nancy? (Center of the World, 1973) – live
 Solos & Duets with Bobby Few (Sun, 1975)
 Unity (ESP-Disk, 2006)

with others
 Jacques Coursil, Trails of Tears (Sunnyside, 2010) – recorded in 2007-09
 The Globe Unity Orchestra, Intergalactic Blow (JAPO, 1983)
 Burton Greene, Firmanence (Fore, 1980)
 Andrew Hill, Strange Serenade (Soul Note, 1980)
 Franz Koglmann and Bill Dixon, Opium for Franz (Pipe, 1977) – recorded in 1976; 3 tracks reissued on Opium (Between the Lines, 2001)
 Shipen Lebzelter, Rock and Other Four Letter Words (Columbia, 1968)
 Jimmy Lyons, Other Afternoons (BYG Actuel, 1970) – recorded in 1969
 Grachan Moncur III, New Africa (BYG Actuel, 1969)
 Itaru Oki, Paris-Ohraï (Ohraï, 2001)
 William Parker,  Requiem with Charles Gayle (Splasc(H), 2006)
 Francois Tusques, Intercommunal Music (Shandar, 1971)

Filmography
2001 - Inside Out in the Open (2001). Directed by Alan Roth.

References

External links
 Alan Silva discography from Center of the World site
 FMP releases
 The Celestrial Communication Orchestra on Discogs
  I.A.C.P. (Institute for Art, Culture and Perception)

1939 births
American jazz double-bassists
Male double-bassists
American jazz keyboardists
Bermudian jazz musicians
Living people
BYG Actuel artists
ESP-Disk artists
Columbia Records artists
American people of Azorean descent
Bermudian emigrants to the United States
21st-century double-bassists
21st-century American male musicians
American male jazz musicians
American people of Portuguese descent